Cyperus curvistylis is a species of sedge that is native to Queensland.

See also 
 List of Cyperus species

References 

curvistylis
Plants described in 1965
Flora of Queensland
Taxa named by Johannes Hendrikus Kern